XTF may refer to:

eXtensible Tag Framework, a framework for implementing new XML elements for Mozilla
eXtended Triton Format, a file format for recording hydrographic survey data
Extensible Text Framework, an XML framework used to present finding aids for archival collections